Sylvan Lake is a lake in Grant County, in the U.S. state of Minnesota.

Sylvan Lake was named for the greenery near its shores, Sylvan representing woodlands in mythology.

See also
List of lakes in Minnesota

References

Lakes of Minnesota
Lakes of Grant County, Minnesota